Tom Hatton is an English host, actor and luxury Real estate agent in New York City.

Education
He trained in theater at The Old Vic theatre in London and theater and film at the Lee Strasberg Theatre Institute in New York.

Career
He hosts Buzz 60, an award-winning global online daily news series.

In 2010, Hatton hosted Sony Pictures International television show In the Qube for the Animax channel.

As an entertainment host he has worked with the news show Sky TV and with YRB Magazine, having interviewed Oscar-winning actor Cuba Gooding Jr., hip-hop musician Chuck D and music producer Bryan-Michael Cox. In 2014. he was the Live Announcer for the VH1 You Oughta Know Live Concert, featuring Nicole Richie and Alicia Keys.

His US television roles include appearances on Law & Order: Special Victims Unit. Hatton provided the voice of the British Prince in the video game Grand Theft Auto IV: The Ballad of Gay Tony.

In 2014, he appeared in major commercials for Head & Shoulders, Febreze and Budweiser for the 2014 FIFA World Cup.

Filmography

Television
 In the Qube (16 episodes, 2010) as Host
  BBC Annual Event 2012 as Host
 A Question of Sport (1 episode, 2005) as Mystery Guest Poker player
 Date Night (1 episode, 2007) as Himself
 Law & Order: Special Victims Unit (1 episode, 2008) as Frat Boy #4
 Life on Mars (1 episode, 2008) as Hippie #2

Video games
 Grand Theft Auto IV: The Ballad of Gay Tony (2009) as British Prince (voice)

References

External links
 
 

Place of birth missing (living people)
Year of birth missing (living people)
20th-century births
Living people
21st-century English male actors
English male television actors
English male video game actors
English television presenters
Lee Strasberg Theatre and Film Institute alumni